The kyat (or ;  ; ISO 4217 code MMK) is the currency of Myanmar (Burma). The typical notation for the kyat is "K" (singular) and "Ks." (plural), placed before the numerals followed by /-.

The term kyat derives from the ancient Burmese unit kyattha, equal to 16.3 (16.329324593) grams of silver.

Current MMK exchange rates
From 2001 to 2012, the official exchange rate varied between Ks. 5/75 and Ks. 6/70 per US dollar (Ks. 8/20 to Ks. 7/- per euro). However, the street rate (black market rate), which more accurately took into account the standing of the national economy, has varied from Ks.750/- to Ks.1,335/- per USD (Ks.985/- to Ks.1,475/- per EUR). The black market exchange rates (USD to MMK) decrease during the peak of the tourist season in Burma (December to January).

On 2 April 2012, the Central Bank of Myanmar announced that the value of the kyat against the US dollar would float, setting an initial rate of Ks.818/- per US dollar.

On 20 March 2013, the Finance Ministry announced that it would abolish Foreign Exchange Certificates (FEC), which were mandatory for tourists to buy at least US$200 worth of until 2003, a measure used to discourage visitors from exchanging on the black market.

More than a year after a coup d'état caused the overthrow of a democratically-elected government, capital flight from Myanmar and inflation accelerated, causing the value of the kyat to plummet to 3500 kyats per USD in the informal market .

History

First kyat, 1852–1889

The kyat was a denomination of both silver and gold coinages in Burma until 1889. It was divided into 16 pe, each of 4 pya, with the mu and mat worth 2 and 4 pe, respectively. Nominally, 16 silver kyats equal 1 gold kyat. The silver kyat was equivalent to the Indian rupee, which replaced the kyat after Burma was conquered by the British.

Second Kyat, 1943–1945
When the Japanese occupied Burma in 1942, they introduced a currency based on the rupee. This was later replaced by banknotes in all kyat denominations. This kyat was subdivided into 100 cents. The currency became worthless at the end of the war when the Burmese rupee was reintroduced in 1945.

Third kyat, 1952–present
The present kyat was introduced on 1 July 1952. It replaced the rupee at par. Decimalisation also took place, with the kyat subdivided into 100 pya.

Coins

First kyat
In Konebone dynasty, Mindon, the second last king of Burma, established the Royal Mint in Mandalay (Central Burma). The dies were made in Paris. Silver coins were minted in denominations of 1 pe, 1 mu (2 pe), 1 mat (4 pe), 5 mu (8 pe) and 1 kyat, with gold 1 pe and 1 mu. The obverses bore the Royal Peacock Seal, from which the coins got their name. The reverse contained the denomination and mint date (in the Burmese era, which starts from AD 638). Further gold coins were issued in 1866 for 1 pe,  mu and 1 kyat, with 5 mu issued in 1878.

Second kyat
No coins were issued for this currency.

Third kyat
In 1952, coins were introduced in denominations of 1, 5, 10, 25 and 50 pyas and K 1/-. The new coins bore the same obverse figure of the Chinthe from the Second kyat coins and the same reverse design, with the value of the coin in Myanmar writing and numerals surrounded by Myanmar flower designs.

In 1966, all coins were redesigned to feature Aung San on the obverse and were all changed in composition to aluminium. Furthermore, the coins were slightly reduced in size. However, they retained the same shapes and overall appearance of the previous series of coins. These were circulated until being discontinued in 1983.

In 1983, a new series of coins was issued in bronze or brass 5, 10, 25, 50 pyas and cupro-nickel 1 kyat. Although the 25 pyas were initially round, it was later redesigned as hexagonal due to size and appearance confusions with the 10 and 50 pyas. These would be the last official series of coins to be issued under the name of "Burma."

1 pya coins were last minted in 1966, with the 5 and 25 pyas last minted in 1987 and the 10 and 50 pyas in 1991.

In 1999, a new series of coins was issued in denominations of bronze K 1/-, brass Ks. 5/- and Ks. 10/-, and cupro-nickel Ks. 50/- and Ks. 100/- under the name "Central Bank of Myanmar." These are also the first coins of Burma to depict Latin letters.  These coins were intended for vendors and services as an alternative to large amounts of worn out, low denomination banknotes. High inflation has since pushed these coins out of circulation.

In late 2008, the Myanmar government announced that new Ks. 50/- and Ks. 100/- coins would be issued. According to newspaper articles, the new Ks. 50/- coin would be made of copper, with the usual Burmese lion on the obverse and the Lotus Fountain from Naypyidaw on the reverse. The Ks.100/- coin would be of cupro-nickel and depict the Burmese lion on the obverse and the value on the reverse.

Banknotes

First kyat
No banknotes were issued for this currency.

Second kyat
The Burma State Bank issued notes for K 1/-, Ks. 5/-, Ks. 10/- and Ks. 100/- in 1944, followed by a further issue of Ks. 100/- notes in 1945.

Third kyat

In 1952, the Union Bank of Burma formed a Currency Board which took over control of the issuing of currency and a more important change to the currency was the introduction of the decimal system in which 1 kyat was decimalised into 100 pyas. On 12 February 1958, the Union Bank of Burma introduced the first kyat notes, in denominations of K 1/-, Ks. 5/-, Ks. 10/- and Ks. 100/-. These were very similar in design to the last series of rupee notes, issued earlier. Later on, 21 August 1958, Ks. 20/- and Ks. 50/- notes were introduced. The Ks. 50/- and Ks. 100/- notes were demonetised on 15 May 1964. This was the first of several demonetisations, ostensibly carried out with the aim of fighting black marketeering.

1965–1971 
The Peoples Bank of Burma took over note production in 1965 with an issue of K 1/-, Ks. 5/-, Ks. 10/- and Ks. 20/- notes.

1972–1988 
In 1972, the Union of Burma Bank took over note issuance, with notes introduced between 1972 and 1979 for K 1/-, Ks. 5/-, Ks. 10/-, Ks. 25/-, Ks. 50/- and Ks. 100/-. The notes were printed by the Security Printing Works in Wazi, Upper Burma (established c. 1972) under the technical direction of the German printing firm Giesecke & Devrient.

On 3 November 1985, the Ks. 50/-, and Ks. 100/- notes were demonetized without warning, though the public was allowed to exchange limited amounts of the old notes for new ones. All other denominations then in circulation remained legal tender. On 10 November 1985, Ks. 75/- notes were introduced, the odd denomination possibly chosen because of dictator general Ne Win's predilection for numerology; the Ks. 75/- note was supposedly introduced to commemorate his 75th birthday. It was followed by the introduction of Ks. 15/- and Ks. 35/- notes on 1 August 1986.

Only two years later, on 5 September 1987, the government demonetised the Ks. 25/-, Ks. 35/-, and Ks. 75/- notes without warning or compensation, rendering some 75% of the country's currency worthless and eliminating the savings of millions of Burmese. On 22 September 1987, banknotes for Ks. 45/- and Ks. 90/- were introduced, both of which incorporated Ne Win's favourite number, nine. The resulting economic disturbances led to serious riots and eventually a coup d'état in 1988 by General Saw Maung.

Banknotes of K -/50, K 1/- and Ks. 5/- are rare. Most daily transactions are rounded up to the nearest Ks.10/-.

1989–present 

Following the change of the country's name to Myanmar on 20 June 1989, new notes began to be issued, but returning to more useful or practical denominations. This time, the old notes were not demonetised, but simply allowed to fall into disuse through inflation as well as wear and tear. On 1 March 1990, K 1/- notes were issued, followed by Ks.200/- notes on 27 March 1990. On 27 March 1994, notes for K -/50 (50 pyas), Ks. 20/-, Ks. 50/-, Ks. 100/-, and Ks. 500/- were issued, followed on 1 May 1995, by new Ks. 5/- and Ks. 10/- notes. Ks. 1,000/- notes were introduced in November 1998.

In 2003, rumours of another pending demonetisation swept through the country, resulting in the junta issuing official denials, but this time, the demonetization did not materialise. In 2004, the sizes of the Ks. 200/-, Ks. 500/-, and Ks. 1,000/- notes were reduced in size (to make all Burmese banknotes uniform in size) but larger notes were allowed to remain in circulation. K -/50, K 1/-, Ks. 5/-, Ks. 10/- and Ks. 20/- banknotes are now rarely seen, because of their low value. Followed on 4 January 2020, by new Ks. 1,000/- notes.

On 1 October 2009, Ks. 5,000/- banknotes were issued measuring 150 x 70 mm. Along the top front is written Central Bank of Myanmar in Burmese, and in the centre is a white elephant. On the back is a picture of Pyidaungsu Hluttaw (Assembly of the Union) legislature buildings, the Central Bank of Myanmar with "FIVE THOUSAND KYATS 5000" written in English. This new denomination is five times larger than the previous largest denomination. Public response has been mixed, with some welcoming a higher value note reducing the number of banknotes which need to be carried. Other responses have suggested a widespread fear that this will simply fuel the current rate of inflation, which was supported by a jump in the black market exchange rates following the public announcement of this change. The Central Bank of Myanmar introduced new Ks. 5,000/- banknotes on 1 October 2014 to prevent counterfeiting, it reported on 18 September. The revised notes are varnished and have enhancements made to the printing, watermarks, and security thread and is the same size, colour and design as the 2009 issue, which continues to be used.
The new notes will last longer and be cleaner, the central bank said. The announcement followed recent media reports that counterfeit Ks. 5,000/- and Ks. 10,000/- banknotes were circulating widely. Police seized eight counterfeit Ks. 10,000/- notes and a printer allegedly used to make them on 12 September in Yangon's Tamwe Township.

On 9 June 2012, the Central Bank announced that Ks. 10,000/- notes would be introduced into circulation to better facilitate financial transactions in a largely cash-oriented economy. They were issued on 15 June 2012.

In 2019, the Central Bank of Myanmar issued a new series of banknotes that feature a portrait of its national hero Aung San after being absent 30 years after the Central Bank of Myanmar issued its current series of banknotes that featured images of the Chinthe and elephants. The first denomination issued for this new series was the Ks. 1,000/- banknote, which was issued into circulation on 4 January 2020, followed by the Ks. 500/- banknote on 19 July 2020.

Ever since the Third Kyat was introduced, the Myanmar currency has no indication of the date in which the note came into circulation nor the signature of the issuing authority.

Foreign exchange certificates
In 1993, Myanmar began issuing foreign exchange certificates (FEC) denominated in US dollars in denominations of $1, $5, $10, and $20. These were exchanged on a parity ratio with and were valued separately from the regular kyat. Conversion of foreign currency into kyats was made illegal as exchange rates were set artificially high. During much of this period, two valuations of the Myanmar kyat emerged; The official rate which averaged around Ks. 6/- = US$1, and the black market rate which averaged tens of times higher. Foreign visitors to Myanmar could only transact currency in FEC's or could only obtain kyats at the artificially high official rates. Illegal peddlers often had to be sought out to exchange currency.

On 1 April 2012, the Government of Myanmar began allowing for a managed float of the kyat and legalised the use and exchange of foreign currencies in Myanmar to better reflect the global exchange rates, attract investment, and to weaken the black markets. On 20 March 2013, the government announced the discontinuation and gradual withdrawal of FEC's.

Redesign proposal 
Following the removal of General Aung San's portraits from the banknotes of the Myanmar kyat in 1987, there have been calls by both the public and opposition politicians to reinstate them, as well as criticizing the use of animals on banknotes in circulation. Writer Nyi Maung notes that foreign countries use portraits of their national leaders and heroes on their banknotes, such as Thailand, and encourages the reinstatement of General Aung San's portrait on the kyat to remember his legacy. In October 2017, a proposal was submitted by National League for Democracy MP Aung Khin Win to debate the issue in the Pyithu Hluttaw.

While the Central Bank of Myanmar argues that the cost of reprinting new notes bearing the General's portrait would be monumental considering Myanmar's current economic situation, Aung Khin Win stated that new notes would only be reprinted to replace damaged notes or in the release of new denominations or size of kyat banknotes.

The debate on this issue took place in the Pyithu Hluttaw on 17 November 2017. The proposal was wholly rejected by the military bloc, but it was passed with 286 votes for, and 109 against.

2020 redesign 

On 21 December 2019, the Central Bank of Myanmar announced that in conjunction with the 72nd anniversary of Myanmar's independence, it would begin circulating Ks. 1,000/- notes bearing the portrait of General Aung San. The bank notes were released to the public on 4 January 2020, marking the return of the national icon's image to the country's currency for the first time in thirty years.

On 18 June 2020, the Central Bank of Myanmar announced that it would begin circulating Ks. 500/- notes bearing the portrait of General Aung San on 19 July 2020, in conjunction with the 73rd anniversary of Martyr's Day.

Both the Ks. 500/- and Ks. 1,000/- banknotes bearing Aung San's portrait, are in concurrent circulation with the existing chinthe portrait bank notes, which will continue to remain in legal tender.

References

External links
 Central Bank of Myanmar
 THE UNIVERSAL PAYMENT SYSTEM - Kyat to Myanmar

Kyat
Currencies introduced in 1852